Toxochitona is a genus of butterflies in the family Lycaenidae. The species of this genus are endemic to the Afrotropical realm.

Species
Toxochitona ankole Stempffer, 1967
Toxochitona gerda (Kirby, 1890)
Toxochitona sankuru Stempffer, 1961
Toxochitona vansomereni (Stempffer, 1954)

References

 Seitz, A. Die Gross-Schmetterlinge der Erde 13: Die Afrikanischen Tagfalter. Plate XIII 62

Poritiinae
Lycaenidae genera